Nobel Peace is a 2020 Indian Hindi-language feature film directed and written by Astik Dalai and produced by Kala Niketan Entertainment. The film stars Hiten Tejwani, Mudasir Zafar, Mayur Mehta and Aarti Sharma.

Plot 
Nobel Peace is about the journey of a young boy Hayan Mir, who finds purpose in life using the power of social media. Under the  guidance of a college professor Shlok Manas, Hayan starts an awareness movement with an aim to bring peace in the society plagued by underlying hatred due to biased ethnic sentiments. However, fate has something else in store for him and his mentor.

The story is set in the beautiful town Bhaderwah amidst the scenic Kashmir valley. Through Hayan's story, the film is a silent statement on the underlying tension that persists in the beautiful valley even when everything is normal.

Cast 
 Hiten Tejwani as Professor Shlok Manhas
 Mudasir Zafar as Hayan Mir
 Mayur Mehta as Asif Alam
 Aarti Sharma as Fariha
 Rohit Raj as Lawyer

References

External links 
 

2020 films
2020s Hindi-language films
Films about terrorism in Asia